USS Munrio (ID-2054) was a cargo ship that served in the United States Navy from 1918 to 1919.

SS Munrio was built as a commercial cargo ship by the Maryland Steel Company at Sparrows Point, Maryland, in 1916, for the Munson Steamship Line. The U.S. Navy acquired Munrio from Munson on 14 November 1918, assigned her the naval registry Identification Number (Id. No.) 2054, and commissioned her as USS Munrio at Philadelphia, Pennsylvania, the same day.

Assigned to the Naval Overseas Transportation Service (NOTS), Munrio departed Philadelphia with a cargo of 4,207 tons of United States Army supplies for France on 21 November 1918, arriving at Le Havre, France, on 10 December 1918 to unload her cargo. On 25 December 1918 she crossed the English Channel to Plymouth, England. On 27 December 1918 she got underway with a mixed U.S. Army cargo of 2,500 tons for Philadelphia, where she arrived on 12 January 1919.

Munrio was decommissioned on 3 February 1919 and transferred to the United States Shipping Board the same day for simultaneous return to Munson Steamship Line.

She returned to mercantile service as SS Munrio, operating under that name until 1937, when she was renamed SS Szent Gellert. She became SS Carola in 1940, SS Mary Louise in 1946 and SS Maria L. in 1950. She underwent two more name changes in 1950, to SS Tropic and then SS Nerina, before her long career came to an end when she was wrecked near Santa Cruz del Norte, Cuba, on 25 November 1950.

References

Department of the Navy, Naval Historical Center: Online Library of Selected Images: Civilian Ships: S.S. Munrio (American Freighter, 1916) Served as USS Munrio (ID # 2054) in 1918-1919. Later S.S. Szent Gellert, Carola, Mary Louise, Maria L., Tropic, and Nerina.
NavSource Online NavSource Online: Section Patrol Craft Photo Archive Munrio (ID 2054)

Ships built in Sparrows Point, Maryland
1916 ships
Cargo ships of the United States Navy